SIM is a 2013 Malayalam film directed by Diphan, featuring Ann Augustine, Deepak, Manikandan in lead roles. SIM, which is an acronym for "Sorry I am Mad", was produced by Royson Vellara. The film released on 19 March 2013.

Plot synopsis
Insisted by his colleagues, Seetharama Iyer, a villager, joins social media to find the perfect wife for himself. However, his life changes completely after he receives a call from a stranger.

Cast
 Manikandan Pattambi as Seetharama Iyer
 Ann Augustine as Pooja
 Deepak Parambol as Karthik
 Vaigha Rose as Rukmini
 Vinod Kovoor as K.P. Abdullah
 Sukumari as Seetharama Iyer's paatti
 Anoop Chandran as Rameshan
 Colin Paul Mavely 
 Praveen Prem as Unni Pillai
 Rehna (Asianet City Girls fame) as Aisha
 Soja Jolly

Reception
Aswin J Kumar from The Times of India gave 2 stars wrote "What pushes SIM beyond mediocrity is a script ridden with characters whose humour is bland and actions perplexing". Sify wrote "With a rather silly and predictable storyline, stale jokes and pretty ordinary direction, the film make you cringe in your seats right from the beginning". Paresh C Palicha from Rediff gave 1.5 stars wrote "Director Diphan tires to steps out of his comfort zone but fails to deliver a good film in SIM". Veeyen from Nowrunning wrote "SIM directed by Diphan has a message that is best suited for a 3 minute commercial, but which gets elongated beyond imagination into a two hour long humdrum drama".

References

2010s Malayalam-language films
Films directed by Diphan